G. R. Smith (born June 2, 1981) is an American professional dirt racing and stock car racing driver and team owner. He has raced in the NASCAR Camping World Truck Series and the ARCA Re/Max Series previously and currently runs nationally in Dirt Super Late Models for his own team, Team 22 in the No. 22 Longhorn Chassis.

Racing career
He began his career racing on dirt tracks in his home state of New Jersey, winning the track championship at Bridgeport Speedway in 2001 and the track championship at New Egypt Speedway in 2002. He also raced super late models starting in 2006 after graduating from college.

Smith raced part-time in the ARCA Re/Max Series for three years from 2004 through 2006. He made his debut at Lake Erie Speedway in the No. 06 for Bobby Gerhart Racing, using Wayne Peterson's owner points. Three races later, he returned for BGR to race at Toledo in the No. 94. In both of those starts, Smith ran in the top-10 during a portion of the race. In 2005, Smith began the season driving for Bob Schacht Motorsports in their No. 75 Ford at ARCA's Daytona testing, with anticipation that the team would be able to run full-time. He would only end up running the first two races for that team before running the next three for Keith Murt's No. 19 team. After not making any more ARCA starts for the rest of the 2005 season, Smith returned for the Daytona season-opener again the following year, returning to Bobby Gerhart's team in his No. 7 car. This ended up being his last ARCA start.

In 2010, he would go on to made two Truck Series attempts (at Nashville and Kansas) for MAKE Motorsports in their No. 50 Dodge. He was the new team's first driver. When it was first announced that he would join the team, team owners Mark Beaver and Tracy Lowe indicated they hoped he could run the full season in 2011. However, this did not happen, and T. J. Bell became MAKE's driver instead of Smith in the middle of the 2010 season and then in 2011 as well.

He has not made many NASCAR or ARCA starts since then, but was still racing as of 2015, often competing in late model events in the World of Outlaws Late Model Series.

Personal life
He is from Folsom, New Jersey, and attended West Virginia University where he earned a degree in sports business (communications and athletic coaching). After graduating in 2006, Smith moved to Cornelius, North Carolina (near where most NASCAR teams are located) to go racing. He also owns a business called Victory Circle Auto Sales, and shut down his late model team in 2010 to focus on growing his business.

Smith also played ice hockey in college and could have had an NHL career, but was in a better position to have a career in racing, so he stuck with that afterwards.

G. R. is Smith's nickname, and it stands for "Great Racer".

Motorsports career results

NASCAR
(key) (Bold – Pole position awarded by qualifying time. Italics – Pole position earned by points standings or practice time. * – Most laps led.)

Camping World Truck Series

ARCA Re/Max Series
(key) (Bold – Pole position awarded by qualifying time. Italics – Pole position earned by points standings or practice time. * – Most laps led.)

References

External links
 

1981 births
NASCAR drivers
ARCA Menards Series drivers
Living people
People from Folsom, New Jersey
Racing drivers from New Jersey
Sportspeople from Atlantic County, New Jersey